Karttunen is a Finnish surname. Notable people with the surname include:

Anssi Karttunen (born 1960), Finnish classical cellist
Frances Karttunen (born 1942), American linguist, historian and writer
Hanna Karttunen, Finnish dancer
Lauri Karttunen (born 1941), American linguist
Mika Karttunen (born 1981), Finnish chess player
Ossi Karttunen (born 1948), Finnish sprinter

See also
3758 Karttunen, a main-belt asteroid

Finnish-language surnames